Claire Bishop is a British art historian, critic, and Professor of Art History at The Graduate Center, CUNY, New York where she has taught since September 2008.

Bishop is known as one of the central theorists of participation in visual art and performance. Her 2004 essay titled “Antagonism and Relational Aesthetics,” which was published in October, remains an influential critique of relational aesthetics. Bishop's books have been translated into over eighteen languages and she is a frequent contributor to art journals including Artforum and October.

Early life and education

Bishop grew up on the Welsh border and attended Welshpool High School. She received a B.A. in art history from St John's College, Cambridge in 1994 and completed her MA and Ph.D in art history and theory at Essex University in 1996 and 2002 respectively. Bishop was a tutor in critical theory in the Curating Contemporary Art department at the Royal College of Art, London from 2001 to 2006, before becoming an associate professor in the department of Art History at the University of Warwick, Coventry from 2006 to 2008.

Career 

Bishop's book Artificial Hells: Participatory Art and the Politics of Spectatorship (2012) is the first historical and theoretical overview of socially engaged participatory art, best known in the U.S. as "social practice." In it, Bishop follows the trajectory of twentieth-century art and examines key moments in the development of a participatory aesthetic. This Itinerary takes in Futurism and Dada; the Situationist International; Happenings in Eastern Europe, Argentina, and Paris; the 1970 Community Arts Movement; and the Artists Placement Group. It concludes with a discussion of long-term educational projects by contemporary artists such as Thomas Hirschhorn, Tania Bruguera, Pawel Althamer, and Paul Chan. Artificial Hells: Participatory Art and the Politics of Spectatorship was reviewed in a wide range of publications including Art in America, Art Journal, CAA Reviews, Art Review, Art Monthly, and TDR: The Drama Review. In 2013, Artificial Hells won the Frank Jewett Mather Prize for art criticism and the ASAP book prize.

Bishop is also the author of the short book Radical Museology, or, What's Contemporary in Museums of Contemporary Art? (2013), with drawings by Dan Perjovschi, which has been translated into Romanian, Russian, Korean, Spanish, and Italian.

Her current research looks at contemporary art and performance as a way to understand the changing impact of digital technology upon attention. Part of this research was published as 'Black Box, White Cube, Gray Zone: Dance Exhibitions and Audience Attention' TDR, Summer 2018.

In 2020 she published a book of conversations with the Cuban artist Tania Bruguera.

Selected publications

Books
Installation Art: A Critical History. London: Tate, 2005.
Artificial Hells: Participatory Art and the Politics of Spectatorship. London: Verso, 2012.
Radical Museology, or, What's Contemporary in Museums of Contemporary Art? London: Koenig Books, 2013
Claire Bishop in conversation with/en conversación con Tania Bruguera,' NY: Cisneros 2020

Edited VolumesParticipation. London: Whitechapel/MIT Press, 2006.1968-1989: Political Upheaval and Artistic Change. Co-edited with Marta Dziewanska. Warsaw: Museum of Modern Art, 2010.Double Agent. London: ICA, 2009.()

Papers
 'History Depletes Itself' Claire Bishop on Danh Vo at The Danish Pavilion and Punta Della Dogana at the Venice Biennale 2015, Artforum, September 2015 
 'The Perils and Possibilities of Dance in the Museum: Tate, MoMA, and Whitney', Dance Research Journal, Vol. 46, No. 3, December 2014 
 'Reconstruction Era: The Anachronic Time(s) of Installation Art', When Attitudes Become Form: Bern 1969/Venice 2013, Progetto Prada Arte, Milan 2013.
 'The Digital Divide: Contemporary Art and New Media', Artforum, September 2012.
 'Delegated Performance: Outsourcing Authenticity', October, no. 140, Spring 2012.
 'The Social Turn: Collaboration and Its Discontents', Artforum, February 2006.
 'Antagonism and Relational Aesthetics', October'', No.110, Fall 2004.

References

External links 

List of publications
Academia.edu profile
CUNY Academic Commons profile

British art historians
Women art historians
Alumni of St John's College, Cambridge
City University of New York faculty
Graduate Center, CUNY faculty
Alumni of the University of Essex
Living people
1971 births